Psittacodrillia albonodulosa is a species of sea snail, a marine gastropod mollusk in the family Horaiclavidae.

Description
The length of the shell attains 8.3 mm, its diameter 4 mm.

The small, dark-red shell contains six convex whorls and, contrary to the other species in this genus, the apex is not papilliform but slightly depressed. The shell has 10 axial ribs on the whorls. The body whorl has only 6 or 7 ribs, the last part without ribs. The white marks on the ribs is continued as a white band on the smooth part, but it is superficial and not deeply seated. The shell shows spiral striae over whole whorl, 5–6 on the sulcus, 14-15 (or more) below (visible in worn specimens only between the ribs) and c. 15 stronger and more widely spaced striae on base. The aperture is oblong-ovate. The outer lip has a thin border. The columella is upright and shows a small callus. The wide siphonal canal is shallow The shell shows a vestigial varix and fasciole.

Distribution
This marine species occurs off Jeffrey's Bay - Northeast Cape, South Africa

References

 Kilburn, R.N. & Rippey, E. (1982) Sea Shells of Southern Africa. Macmillan South Africa, Johannesburg, xi + 249 pp. page(s): 117
 Kilburn R.N. (1988), Turridae (Mollusca: Gastropoda) of southern Africa and Mozambique. Part 4. Subfamilies Drilliinae, Crassispirinae and Strictispirinae; Ann. Natal Mus. Vol. 29(1) pp. 167–320
 Steyn, D.G. & Lussi, M. (1998) Marine Shells of South Africa. An Illustrated Collector’s Guide to Beached Shells. Ekogilde Publishers, Hartebeespoort, South Africa, ii + 264 pp. page(s): 152

External links
 Tucker, J.K. 2004 Catalog of recent and fossil turrids (Mollusca: Gastropoda). Zootaxa 682:1-1295.

Endemic fauna of South Africa
albonodulosa